Carbonates and Evaporites is an international scientific journal published 4 times a year by Springer and provides a forum for the exchange of concepts, research and applications on all aspects of carbonate and evaporite geology.  This includes the origin and stratigraphy of carbonate, and evaporite rocks and issues unique to these rock types: weathering phenomena, notably karst; engineering, environmental   issues; mining, minerals extraction and caves and permeability.

Editorial Board 
Editor: J.W. LaMoreaux

References

External links 
 

English-language journals
Geology journals
Springer Science+Business Media academic journals